The International Bee Research Association is a charity based in the United Kingdom which exists to promote the value of bees and provide information on bee science and beekeeping worldwide. It was founded in 1949 as the Bee Research Association. It regularly publishes two journals: Bee World and Journal of Apicultural Research.

References

External links 
 

Beekeeping organizations
Beekeeping in the United Kingdom
Charities based in Wales
Agricultural organisations based in the United Kingdom
1949 establishments in the United Kingdom
Organizations established in 1949